Farbror Pekkas handelsbod (Uncle Pekka's General Store) was the Sveriges Television's Christmas calendar and Sveriges Radio's Christmas Calendar in 1965.

Plot 
Pekka Langer runs a shop in the fictional village of Vinterbo in northern Sweden, where he sold Christmas things. The villagers often came to the various shops and shopped. Pekka Langer was also visited by a family from the city who rented a summer cottage, and one day they visited a Sami family. The music in the series was performed by students from Nacka Music School. The script was written by Lars Björkman and the producer was Torbjörn Wiléen .

References

External links 
 

1965 radio programme debuts
1965 radio programme endings
1965 Swedish television series debuts
1965 Swedish television series endings
Sveriges Radio's Christmas Calendar
Sveriges Television's Christmas calendar
Television shows set in Sweden